Premix and postmix are two methods of serving – usually carbonated – soft drinks that are alternatives to bottles and cans.

Premix
Premix refers to a ready-mixed, ready-to-drink soft drink that has usually been packaged in 5-gallon stainless steel tanks called Cornelius kegs (or "Corny keg" for short).  The premix itself is identical to the beverage of the same brand that is sold in bottles or cans, and is already carbonated. The soft drink is passed through a premix dispenser that refrigerates it before dispensing it through a pressure-compensating valve or tap.

A premix dispenser is suitable for outlets that regularly sell the particular soft drink, but in relatively small amounts.

At the plant, a quality control manager periodically checks the carbonation level of the premix tanks with a carbonation tester before shipment.

Postmix
Postmix refers to the system in which a flavored syrup (concentrate) of the soft drink is shipped to the retailer, usually in a returnable tank or a disposable bag-in-box container. At the point of sale, the soft drink is mixed to order from the postmix syrup, chilled and purified water, and carbon dioxide (from a gas cylinder), and usually dispensed from a soda fountain or soda gun.

A postmix dispenser is a more sophisticated device than a premix dispenser.  The postmix system is suitable for outlets that serve large amounts of soft drinks quickly, such as a sports stadium or a busy fast-food restaurant.

References
 
 

Mixed drinks
Soft drinks
Cola
Liquid containers
Packaging